Ross 614 (V577 Monocerotis) is a red dwarf UV Ceti flare star and it is the primary member of a nearby binary star system in the constellation of Monoceros. This star has a magnitude of about 11, making it invisible to the unaided eye even though it is one of the stars nearest to the Sun. This system is among the closest to the Sun at an estimated distance of about 13.3 light years. Because this star is so close to the Earth it is often the subject of study, hence the large number of designations by which it is known.

Binary star system

This binary star system consists of two closely spaced low-mass red dwarfs. The secondary star is a dim magnitude 14 lost in the glare of the nearby primary star.

A study by George Gatewood in 2003 using older sources along with data from the Hipparcos satellite yielded an orbital period of about 16.6 years and a semi-major axis separation of about 1.1 arc seconds (2.4–5.3 AU).

History
The primary star was discovered in 1927 by F. E. Ross using the  refractor telescope at the Yerkes Observatory. He noticed the high proper motion of this dim 11th magnitude star in his second-epoch plates that were part of an astronomical survey started by E. E. Barnard, his predecessor at the observatory. Ross then included this new star in his eponymous catalog along with many others he discovered.

The first detection of a binary system was in 1936 by Dirk Reuyl using the 26-in refractor telescope of the McCormick Observatory at the University of Virginia using astrometric analysis of photographic plates. In 1951 Sarah L. Lippincott made the first reasonably accurate predictions of the position of the secondary star using the  refractor telescope of the Sproul Observatory. These calculations were used by Walter Baade to find and optically resolve this binary system for the first time using the then new  Hale Telescope at the Palomar Observatory in California.

See also
 List of nearest stars

References

Notes

Local Bubble
M-type main-sequence stars
Monoceros (constellation)
Binary stars
614
030920
0234
Monocerotis, V577